Florin Valeriu Răducioiu (born 17 March 1970) is a Romanian former professional footballer who played as a striker for Dinamo București, A.C. Milan, Brescia Calcio, West Ham United, RCD Espanyol, VfB Stuttgart and AS Monaco. He played for Romania at the 1990 FIFA World Cup, the 1994 FIFA World Cup and the UEFA Euro 1996.

Club career 

Răducioiu was a product of Dinamo București. Mircea Lucescu, former Dinamo coach, saw his skills and, as a feature of his philosophy towards football to promote young players, gave Răducioiu the chance to play at the highest level at the age of 17 years.

By the beginning of 1988–89, Răducioiu was first-choice in Lucescu's team. He made an impressive debut in European football by reaching the quarterfinals of the 1988–89 Cup Winners' Cup (ousted by U.C. Sampdoria in the quarterfinals, on away goals) and finishing second in the league. By 1989–90, Răducioiu was one of Romania's finest players, and that year was to be the most significant of his early career. He won the Romanian championship and the cup (hat-trick in the final against Steaua), reaching the semifinals of the 1989–90 Cup Winners' Cup, where Dinamo was defeated by RSC Anderlecht.

After two seasons in Serie A, Răducioiu joined A.C. Milan in 1993–94, making only seven appearances and scoring two goals, but winning the UEFA Champions League. In 1994, he went to La Liga to play for RCD Espanyol.

Having scored his country's only goal in UEFA Euro 1996 manager Harry Redknapp signed him for West Ham United in 1996. Most famously, he scored a goal against Manchester United after being criticized by Redknapp for going shopping with his wife at Harvey Nichols on a previous match day; a claim Răducioiu denies. Despite showing promise, he never adapted to the pace and competitive nature of the English game, making no real impact at Upton Park. He scored three goals during his spell with the Hammers. In addition to his goal against Manchester United he scored against Stockport County in the League Cup and Sunderland in the league. After his short underachieving spell at the East London club, having fallen out with manager Redknapp, he was transferred back to Espanyol, having scored just two goals in the Premier League.

Răducioiu retired in 2004, after a short stint with modest French side US Créteil-Lusitanos. He had a short spell as a sports agent and as sporting director at Dinamo Bucharest.

He is one of the three professional football players (alongside Christian Poulsen and Stevan Jovetic) to have plied his trade in the top five European leagues (England, Spain, Germany, Italy and France).

International career 
Răducioiu debuted for the Romania national team in a friendly game against Israel on 25 April 1990, playing for 58 minutes before he was replaced.
Răducioiu made his FIFA World Cup debut in 1990 against the Soviet Union at the Stadio San Nicola in Bari, aged 20. Appearing in three games for Romania, he finished the tournament without scoring, and Romania fell to the Republic of Ireland in the second round, in a penalty shootout.
Răducioiu had to wait until the last game of 1990 to score his first goal. He scored for Romania in a 6–0 victory over San Marino on 5 December in a qualifying match for UEFA Euro 1992, only to double his account in the next game in San Marino, as the Romanians won 3–1.

The year 1993 would be significantly more successful for Răducioiu internationally, as he scored two goals against Czechoslovakia in Košice, even though Romania lost 5–2. Răducioiu's second goal came in the 55th minute, to tie the game at 2–2. However, Slovak player Peter Dubovsky scored a second half hat-trick to beat Romania. His first goal came just four minutes after Răducioiu's second, and in the final eight minutes, Dubosky scored twice to win the game, even though the Czechoslovak had had two players sent off.

An even greater success for Răducioiu would come three months later when in Toftir, he managed to score all four of Romania's goals against the Faroe Islands, becoming the first Romanian player to score four goals for the Romania national team in modern times, a record equaled only by Gheorghe Popescu in 1997 against Liechtenstein.

Răducioiu also scored a penalty kick against Belgium in the qualifiers for the 1994 World Cup. In the last group game of qualifying, he scored another goal against Wales finishing a nice team effort after a pass from Ilie Dumitrescu. This late goal, coming in the 83rd minute, sent Romania to the top of its group from the potential third place in the case that the game had ended 1–0, and subsequently to the 1994 FIFA World Cup.

At the 1994 FIFA World Cup, Răducioiu scored two goals against Colombia during the qualifying round. In the quarterfinal against Sweden, he first equalized Sweden's 0–1 lead in the 88th minute of regular time, taking the game to extra time, where he put Romania ahead 2–1 in the first period. Shortly thereafter, Sweden's Stefan Schwarz was sent off after his second yellow card, but despite this Kennet Andersson equalized the game in the 115th minute, leading to a shootout. Răducioiu scored Romania's first penalty attempt after Sweden had missed its first, but Romania was eliminated after missing two attempts out of six. Still, Răducioiu's four tournament goals helped Romania to its most successful FIFA World Cup campaign ever.

At the UEFA Euro 1996, as Romania lost all three group stage matches, Răducioiu netted the nation's only goal, in a 2–1 loss against Spain. Overall he won 40 caps between April 1990 and June 1996.

Career statistics 
Scores and results list Romania's goal tally first, score column indicates score after each Răducioiu goal.

Honours 
Dinamo Bucharest
 Romanian League: 1989–90
 Romanian Cup: 1985–86, 1989–90

AC Milan
 Serie A: 1993–94
 Supercoppa Italiana: 1993
 UEFA Champions League: 1993–94
 Intercontinental Cup runner-up: 1993

VfB Stuttgart
 UEFA Cup Winners' Cup runner-up; 1997–98

References

External links

 
 
 

1970 births
Living people
Romanian footballers
Footballers from Bucharest
Association football forwards
Romania international footballers
UEFA Champions League winning players
Liga I players
Serie A players
Serie B players
La Liga players
Premier League players
Bundesliga players
Ligue 1 players
FC Dinamo București players
S.S.C. Bari players
Hellas Verona F.C. players
Brescia Calcio players
A.C. Milan players
RCD Espanyol footballers
West Ham United F.C. players
VfB Stuttgart players
AS Monaco FC players
US Créteil-Lusitanos players
1990 FIFA World Cup players
1994 FIFA World Cup players
UEFA Euro 1996 players
Naturalised citizens of Italy
Romanian football managers
Romanian expatriate footballers
Romanian expatriate sportspeople in Italy
Expatriate footballers in Italy
Romanian expatriate sportspeople in Spain
Expatriate footballers in Spain
Romanian expatriate sportspeople in England
Expatriate footballers in England
Romanian expatriate sportspeople in Germany
Expatriate footballers in Germany
Romanian expatriate sportspeople in Monaco
Expatriate footballers in Monaco
Romanian expatriate sportspeople in France
Expatriate footballers in France